Liu Wen (born 27 January 1988) is a Chinese model. In 2012, The New York Times dubbed her "China’s first bona fide supermodel".  She was the first Chinese model to walk the Victoria's Secret Fashion Show, the first East Asian spokesmodel for Estée Lauder cosmetics, and the first Asian model to ever make Forbes magazine's annual highest-paid models list. In 2017, Liu became the second Chinese model to ever appear on the cover of American Vogue, and the first to be featured on the front cover rather than foldout. She landed on the cover a second time in American Vogue's April 2020 issue, becoming the first person of Chinese descent to appear twice. She is currently represented by The Society Management and is based in New York City.

Early life
Liu was born in Yongzhou, Hunan province, China. Liu was encouraged by her mother to pursue modeling in order to improve her posture after she developed the habit of hunching her back as she towered over her classmates.

Career
In 2005, 17-year old Liu won the semi-final of the New Silk Road World model contest in her home province of Hunan. She was motivated to participate because the winning prize included a new laptop. Although she didn't place in the top 10 during the national final, she was offered to model in Beijing. She initially struggled to find jobs because her appearance didn't match the commercial look that was in demand at the time. However, Liu eventually became a sought-after model and gained first attention by the international modeling industry in 2007, when she appeared in an editorial for Chinese Cosmopolitan, styled as Karl Lagerfeld and Viktor & Rolf.

In February 2008, she appeared in four fashion-related articles for Chinese Vogue. She debuted on international runways in the same month, walking for Burberry and closing the fall Trussardi show in Milan. The week after, she walked for Chanel, Jean Paul Gaultier, and Hermès in Paris. A year later in February and March 2009, Liu Wen appeared in 74 shows in New York, London, Milan, and Paris for the Fall 2009 ready-to-wear season — this was the highest number shows for a model in that season. It also remains the record for the most shows ever walked by a model of Asian descent in a single season. She followed that up with the Spring 2010 ready-to-wear season, walking 70 shows in the same four cities. This statistic made her the second most booked model for the season following French model Constance Jablonski.

Liu has appeared in campaigns for Calvin Klein, Dolce & Gabbana, Roberto Cavalli, Oscar de la Renta, Hugo Boss, Alexander Wang, Rag & Bone, H&M, Marni, Lane Crawford, Bergdorf Goodman, Diesel, Gap, and Vivienne Tam. Her record for a single season is seven including DKNY Jeans, The GAP, Barneys New York, Benetton, Alexander Wang, Converse, and cKone in Spring 2009.  She has been featured as the only female in major Vogue editorials for Vogue Germany, Vogue Espana, Vogue China, Vogue Italia, British Vogue, and American Vogue. She has also been featured in editorials for Numéro (as well as a cover), GQ, V magazine, Harper's Bazaar, Pop Magazine, Allure, i-D (as well as a cover), Interview, and W.

In 2009, Liu became the first woman of Chinese descent to walk in the Victoria's Secret Fashion Show. Liu also participated in the 2010-2012 shows. She returned to the Victoria's Secret runway again in 2016, 2017, and 2018.

In April 2010, it was announced that Liu along with Constance Jablonski and Joan Smalls would help to represent the cosmetics company Estée Lauder. In March 2012, The New York Times featured Liu Wen on the cover and in the main feature for their Style "T" Magazine's Travel Issue, and she was dubbed "China’s first bona fide supermodel". In the same year, she attended the Cannes Film Festival for the first time. In Spring 2013, Liu Wen was dubbed one of "The New Icons" by H&M for her widely admired street-style.

In 2013 she also became the first Asian to be in the top five on Forbes' list of the world's highest-paid models, as number 5. She repeated the feat in 2014, with her salary rising from $4.3 million the previous year to $7 million. Also in 2013, Liu gained a rank of #3 on the Top 50 Models Women List by Models.com. She is the highest-ranked model of Asian descent in history. In July 2014, Models.com elevated her to the status of "New Supermodel", the first Asian model to ever receive that honor. She remains on that list as of February 2015.

Liu Wen has garnered a heavy social media following on platforms such as Instagram and Weibo. The immensity of her audience led American Vogue to dub her as a leader in the digital movement, saying in their April 2014 issue, in an article about social media’s rise in the fashion industry, that "Liu also has, by far, the biggest social-media audience of any model". Models.com dubbed her the first ever Asian "New Supermodel" in July 2014.

In October of the same year, Liu became the first person in the world to showcase an Apple Watch on a magazine cover when she appeared on Vogue China's November 2014 issue.

In April 2015, she and South Korean singer Choi Siwon participated in a Chinese spin-off of the South Korean variety show We Got Married''.

In 2017, Liu Wen became the second ever Chinese model to appear on the front cover of American Vogue for its 125th Anniversary March 2017 issue, photographed by Inez Van Lamsweerde & Vinoodh Matadin alongside Adwoa Aboah, Ashley Graham, Gigi Hadid, Imaan Hammam, Kendall Jenner, and Vittoria Ceretti.

As a model, Wen has been associated with several major global brands. Examples of brands that have featured Wen in their marketing efforts include Calvin Klein, Hugo Boss, Roberto Cavalli, and Dolce & Gabbana. The model has also marketed products manufactured by Gap, H&M, Prada, and Bergdorf Goodman. Also, Chanel Beauty – a French company that produces luxury clothes and accessories – has appointed Wen as its global ambassador. These engagements have contributed significantly to Wen's growth as a professional in her modeling career.

Currently, Wen resides in New York. The model has previously indicated that she is yet to consider having romantic relations and that she is more focused on pursuing her career. The supermodel also enjoys traveling, and she created a hashtag on Instagram titled #WenInFlight and which documents her experiences across the world. Moreover, the model has also participated in acting stints that have enabled her to feature in dating shows. In 2018, Wen was criticized by Chinese online users for affiliating herself with other countries and forgetting her heritage. The incident took place following a post by the supermodel on social media. Nonetheless, Wen has managed to avoid controversy throughout her modeling career.

Controversy
In February 2018, Liu Wen posted a photo on Instagram showing herself and Wendi Deng Murdoch with the English caption "Happy Lunar New Year!", which drew a large group of Chinese netizens accusing her of forgetting her Chinese roots, pandering to other Asian countries. Numerous other Chinese and international netizens defended her usage of the phrase. As a result, she changed the English caption to "Happy Chinese New Year" later.

After the fashion brand Coach produced a T-shirt listing Hong Kong, Macau and Taiwan as separate countries, rather than under China's flag, Liu cut her contracts with Coach. "I want to apologise for the harm caused to everybody due to my indiscreet selection of brand to represent," she said."I love my country, and will adamantly safeguard China's sovereignty. National sovereignty and territorial integrity are sacred and cannot be violated under any circumstances.""

Personal life
In the past, Liu has said that after modeling she might enjoy working as a stylist or, were the opportunity to arise, as an actress—she feels that modelling and acting have much in common, but for now she enjoys modeling and working in the fashion industry. She has stated that she knows that, as a career choice, working as a fashion designer or stylist would be "very hard work", but she is now more seriously considering becoming a stylist because she would like "to share her fashion style—tomboyish, vintage, and comfortable—with the world".

See also

 Chinese in New York City
 Fashion designer

References

External links

 
 

1988 births
Living people
Chinese female models
People from Yongzhou
Chinese expatriates in the United States
The Society Management models
Elite Model Management models